Anningqu Town is a town and suburb of Ürümqi in Xinjiang, in northwestern China. 
The town, which covers 28 square kilometres, has 5 administrative villages, 21 village groups, and has a total population of 10,554 people.

Anningqu as a town began more than a hundred years ago, and during the Qing dynasty it was a market place for merchants along the Tianshan Road. In 1965 it became the Anningqu Township, one of the official divisions of the prefecture-level city of Ürümqi.

Anningqu Town is located in the northern suburbs of Ürümqi on an alluvial plain and in a temperate arid climate zone. The town has abundant water resources and suitable irrigation for agriculture and animal husbandry.

References

External links
Hudong Encyclopedia 

Populated places in Xinjiang
Township-level divisions of Xinjiang
Ürümqi